I'll Walk Beside You is a 1943 British drama film directed by Maclean Rogers and starring Richard Bird, Lesley Brook and Percy Marmont.

It takes its name from the song "I'll Walk Beside You" by Alan Murray and Edward Lockton,which is played over the opening credits and used as a refrain throughout. The film's production company, Butcher's Film Service, had a tendency of naming their films after popular songs.

Cast
 Richard Bird as John Brent
 Lesley Brook as Ann Johnson 
 Percy Marmont as Vicar
 Leslie Bradley as Tomm Booth
 Sylvia Marriott as Joan Tremayne
 Hugh Miller as Dr. Stevenson
 Beatrice Varley as Miss McKenzie
 Irene Handl as Ma Perkins
 George Merritt as Hancock
 Hilda Bayley as Mrs. Tremayne
 John McHugh as Orchestral Soloist
 St. David's Singers as Vocal Ensemble 
 London Symphony Orchestra as Themselves

References

Bibliography
 Williams, Tony. Structures of Desire: British Cinema, 1939–1955. SUNY Press, 2000.

External links

1943 films
British musical drama films
1940s musical drama films
Films set in England
Films set in London
Films directed by Maclean Rogers
British black-and-white films
1943 drama films
Films scored by Percival Mackey
1940s English-language films
1940s British films